Harry Marshall (1905–1959) was an English footballer.

Harry Marshall may also refer to:

Harry Hatheway Marshall (1873–1950), American-born Canadian politician
Harry Marshall (politician), Western Australian politician
Harry Marshall (Scottish footballer) (1872–1936)

See also
Henry Marshall (disambiguation)
Harold Marshall (disambiguation)